Władysław Kowalski (26 August 1894 – 14 December 1958) was a Polish communist politician, writer and journalist who served as the Minister of Art and Culture and the Sejm Marshal during the first postwar parliament Sejm of the Polish People's Republic  (1947–1952) and, in his capacity as Sejm Marshal, ex officio, as the acting head of state (Acting President of the State National Council) for one day (4–5 February 1947). He was also a publisher and writer.

Kowalski was also known by the pseudonyms Sałas, Bartłomiej Zarychta and Stanisławski.

Life
Władysław Kowalski was born in a small village of Paprotnia near Rawa Mazowiecka (then Russian Empire, now east-central Poland) as a son of farm worker. Because of his family poverty, he graduated just three school grades and later became an autodidact.

He was member of various peasants parties before he became a communist, including the Polish People's Party "Wyzwolenie" (since 1918), the Peasant's Independent Party (1925–1927), United People's Left "Samopomoc" (1927–1931), and People's Party (1944–1949 – various factions). He was also an active member of the Communist Party of Poland (since 1928) and Polish Workers' Party (since 1942).

Kowalski was a longtime member of party leaderships:
 1926–1927: Member of the Central Committee of the PIP
 1944–1945: Vice President of the SL "Wola"
 1945–1949: Member of the Supreme Council of the SL
 1948–1949: SL Leader
 Since 1949: Member of the United People's Party leadership and, from 1949 to 1956 Chairman of the Committee

During World War I he fought in the Imperial Russian Army and later in the Puławy Legion. From 1918 to 1939 in the Second Polish Republic he was an active writer and publisher. During World War II he was a member of the Polish underground resistance. He hid 50 Jews around Warsaw, for which he was recognized as Righteous Among the Nations in 1995.

After the War, he was a Minister of Culture (1945–1947) and member and Vice President of the State National Council.

Works 
Kowalski was an author of novels, articles and poems.

Novels 

 The Peasants of Marchat (1930)
 In Grzmiąca (1936)
 The Mianowski family (1938)

Stories 

 Far and Close (1948)
 Rebellion in Stary Łęk (1951)
 The Beast (1951)
 Wine (1966)

References

1894 births
1958 deaths
People from Rawa County
People from Piotrków Governorate
Polish People's Party "Wyzwolenie" politicians
Communist Party of Poland politicians
Polish Workers' Party politicians
People's Party (Poland) politicians
United People's Party (Poland) politicians
Presidents of Poland
Marshals of the Sejm
Members of the State National Council
Members of the Polish Sejm 1947–1952
Members of the Polish Sejm 1952–1956
Polish male writers
Russian military personnel of World War I
Puławy Legion personnel
Grand Crosses of the Order of Polonia Restituta
Commanders with Star of the Order of Polonia Restituta
Polish communists
Polish writers
Recipients of the Order of the Banner of Work
Polish Righteous Among the Nations
Burials at Powązki Military Cemetery
20th-century Polish journalists